The GPO Film Unit was a subdivision of the UK General Post Office. The unit was established in 1933, taking on responsibilities of the Empire Marketing Board Film Unit. Headed by John Grierson, it was set up to produce sponsored documentary films mainly related to the activities of the GPO.

Among the films it produced were Harry Watt's and Basil Wright's Night Mail (1936), featuring music by Benjamin Britten and poetry by W. H. Auden, which is the best known. Directors who worked for the unit included Humphrey Jennings, Alberto Cavalcanti, Paul Rotha, Harry Watt, Basil Wright and a young Norman McLaren. Poet and memoirist Laurie Lee also worked as a scriptwriter in the unit from 1939–1940.

In 1940 the GPO Film Unit became the Crown Film Unit, under the control of the Ministry of Information.

In Autumn 2008 the British Film Institute issued a first collection of selected films from the Unit. Titled Addressing The Nation, it comprises fifteen titles from the years 1933 to 1935, including Song of Ceylon. A second volume, We Live In Two Worlds was released in February 2009, with 22 films covering the period 1936 to 1938, and includes Night Mail. A third (and final) volume, If War Should Come, appeared in July 2009 and includes London Can Take It!

Filmography

See also

Edgar Anstey
Alberto Cavalcanti
John Grierson
Humphrey Jennings
Stuart Legg
Len Lye
Norman McLaren
Lotte Reiniger
Harry Watt
Basil Wright

References

Further reading
 Anthony, Scott and James G. Mansell. The Projection Of Britain: A History of the GPO Film Unit. London: British Film Institute, 2011  338p.

External links
 GPO Film Unit at the British Film Institute's Screenonline

Film production companies of the United Kingdom
Propaganda film units
State-owned film companies
1933 establishments in the United Kingdom
Film Unit
Documentary film organizations